Chamberlain "Champ" Nnaemeka Oguchi (born April 28, 1986) is a Nigerian American professional basketball player who last played for Boulazac Basket Dordogne of the LNB Pro B. His name "Emeka" is an abbreviation of the Igbo name "Chukwuemeka" (meaning "God has done so much").

College career
Oguchi played college basketball for the Oregon Ducks from 2004 to 2007, before transferring to Illinois State University to play for the Illinois State Redbirds. He normed 39.5 percent on his 3-point attempts for the Redbirds.

Professional career
In 2009, Oguchi signed with the club STB Le Havre of the French Pro-A League. Since his time playing in the French League, Oguchi has played in the: NBA D-League, the Philippine Basketball Association, the Lebanese League, the West Asian League (with the Iraqi club Duhok), the Venezuelan League, the Russian Professional Basketball League, the Liga Endesa of Spain, the Polish Basketball League, the LNBP of Mexico, the French Pro-B League, and the Liga Nacional de Básket of Argentina. 

During his stint in the Philippines, he played for the Meralco Bolts, where-in he became a well known import because of his efficiency in mid range shots coupled with his high percentage and deadly 3-point shooting from very far distances. In his first stint with the Bolts, Oguchi was the top scorer for the 2011 PBA Commissioner’s Cup on his 30.7 points per game. He averaged 28.3 points per game for his 11-game PBA career and shot 40.3 percent on his 3-point attempts. 

During the 2012 Summer Olympics, Oguchi drew interest from a number of NBA teams. On November 1, 2012, Oguchi signed with the NBA D-League team the Maine Red Claws.

On May 13, 2013, he signed with the Spanish League club Gran Canaria.

In August 2015, he signed with Polish club Anwil Włocławek.

Nigerian national team
Oguchi has also been a member of the senior men's Nigerian national basketball team. He played at the 2006 FIBA World Championship, the 2012 Summer Olympics, and the 2016 Summer Olympics. 

At the 2015 FIBA Africa Championship, Oguchi led Nigeria to their first ever AfroBasket title, defeating Angola 74-65. Oguchi led the team in scoring, averaging 16.6 points per game. For his impressive performance throughout the tournament, he was named Most Valuable Player and Best 3-Point Shooter. Oguchi was also named, with Al-Farouq Aminu, into the All Star Five of the 2015 Afrobasket in Tunisia.

References

External links
NBA D-League Profile
FIBA Profile
Asia-Basket.com Profile
Draftexpress.com Profile
Oregon Ducks College Profile
College Stats

1986 births
Living people
African Games bronze medalists for Nigeria
African Games medalists in basketball
American expatriate basketball people in France
American expatriate basketball people in Lebanon
American expatriate basketball people in Mexico
American expatriate basketball people in the Philippines
American expatriate basketball people in Poland
American expatriate basketball people in Russia
American expatriate basketball people in Spain
American expatriate basketball people in Venezuela
American sportspeople of Nigerian descent
Basketball players at the 2012 Summer Olympics
Basketball players at the 2016 Summer Olympics
Basketball players from Houston
BC Spartak Primorye players
CB Gran Canaria players
Illinois State Redbirds men's basketball players
KK Włocławek players
Liga ACB players
Meralco Bolts players
Maine Red Claws players
Nigerian expatriate basketball people in France
Nigerian expatriate basketball people in Lebanon
Nigerian expatriate basketball people in Mexico
Nigerian expatriate basketball people in the Philippines
Nigerian expatriate basketball people in Poland
Nigerian expatriate basketball people in Russia
Nigerian expatriate basketball people in Spain
Nigerian men's basketball players
Olympic basketball players of Nigeria
Oregon Ducks men's basketball players
Panteras de Miranda players
Philippine Basketball Association imports
Shooting guards
Small forwards
Soles de Mexicali players
STB Le Havre players
2006 FIBA World Championship players
American men's basketball players
Competitors at the 2007 All-Africa Games